Events from the year 1718 in Denmark.

Incumbents
 Monarch – Frederick IV
 Grand Chancellor – Christian Christophersen Sehested

Events

Undated
 The Speigelberg Company perform in Denmark.

Births
 January 6 - Christoffer Gabel, statesman (died 1673)
 February 17 - Søren Abildgaard, naturalist, writer and illustrator (died 1791)
 April 15 - Christian Horrebow, astronomer (died 1776)

Deaths
 Marie Grubbe, noble (born 1643)

References

 
Denmark
Years of the 18th century in Denmark